Giorgi IV may refer to:

George IV of Georgia (1191–1223)
Giorgi IV, Catholicos of Kartli in 1225–1230
George IV of Imereti (died in 1684)
George IV of Guria (died in 1726)